A DSP coupling is a self-sealing symmetrical coupling which is secured by inter-connecting two couplings together.

It is closed by turning the locking ring on the triangular part of the opposed DSP coupling.

Extra closure can be applied by locking the connection with couplings wrench.

The DSP coupling locking principle is similar to that of the guillemin coupling.
However, there are differences to the preformed serration on the locking ring and the design of the lugs.

The locking ring of DSP couplings can be turned up to 45°

Mechanical fasteners